Chris Lewis was the defending champion, but lost in the second round this year.

Gene Mayer won the title, defeating Peter Elter 3–6, 6–3, 6–2, 6–1 in the final.

Seeds

  Peter McNamara (second round)
  Gene Mayer (champion)
  Chip Hooper (quarterfinals)
  Mel Purcell (second round)
  Shlomo Glickstein (quarterfinals)
  Chris Lewis (second round)
 n/a
  Stanislav Birner (second round)

Draw

Final

Section 1

Section 2

External links
 1982 Bavarian Tennis Championships Singles draw

Singles